Unionville Milliken Soccer Club is a Canadian semi-professional soccer club based in Unionville, Ontario. The club was founded in 1976 as a youth soccer club and added its men's semi-professional club in League1 Ontario in 2018.

The club also fields a team in the League1 Ontario women's division, which entered the league in the 2017 season.

History
The club was founded in 1976 to serve the communities of Unionville and Milliken in Ontario.

Originally a youth soccer club, the team added semi-professional teams in League1 Ontario in the women's division in 2017, followed by a men's team in 2018. In their inaugural season, the women's team finished in 4th place. Unionville announced that their club would go with a fully professional model, as opposed to an amateur or semi-professional approach, becoming the second fully professional team in the league, after Toronto FC III.

The men's team was formed through a partnership with York Region Shooters, who played in the Canadian Soccer League until 2017, to form a professional club in L1O to begin in 2018, created through the relationship of Shooters' owner Tony De Thomasis and UMSC coach Filipe Bento. They played their inaugural match on April 29, 2018 against Windsor TFC, which resulted in a 3–1 victory. In 2022, the women's reserve team won the League1 Ontario Reserve Division.

Seasons

Men

Women

Notable former players
The following players have either played at the professional or international level, either before or after playing for the League1 Ontario team:

Men

Women

References

Soccer clubs in Ontario
League1 Ontario teams